The Taehyang Line is an electrified secondary railway line of the Korean State Railway in North Hamgyŏng Province, North Korea, from Ryonghyŏn on the P'yŏngra Line to Taehyang.

There is a line that branches off the Taehyang Line leading to two private (Party-use only) stations.

Route 

A yellow background in the "Distance" box indicates that section of the line is not electrified.

References

Railway lines in North Korea
Standard gauge railways in North Korea